SS Albert K. Smiley was a Liberty ship built in the United States during World War II. She was named after Albert K. Smiley, co-founder of Mohonk Mountain House and member of the Board of Indian Commissioners.

Construction
Albert K. Smiley was laid down on 20 October 1944, under a Maritime Commission (MARCOM) contract, MC hull 2386, by J.A. Jones Construction, Brunswick, Georgia; she was sponsored by Mrs. Harry A. Straus, and launched on 21 November 1944.

History
She was allocated to International Freighting Corporation, on 30 November 1944. On 8 December 1948, she was laid up in the National Defense Reserve Fleet, in Mobile, Alabama. On 26 February 1964, she was sold for $45,287, to First Steel & Ship Corp., for scrapping. She was removed from the fleet on 11 March 1964.

References

Bibliography

 
 
 
 
 

 

Liberty ships
Ships built in Brunswick, Georgia
1944 ships
Mobile Reserve Fleet